Here Comes Trouble is a 1948 American comedy film in the Hal Roach's Streamliners series. It was produced and directed by Fred Guiol and written by George Carleton Brown and Edward E. Seabrook. The film stars William Tracy, Joe Sawyer, Emory Parnell, Betty Compson (in her final film) and Joan Woodbury. It was released on March 15, 1948 by United Artists.

Plot
Returning home from his army service in the Pacific, Dodo Doubleday resumes his former job as a copy boy at a newspaper. Dodo's girlfriend Penny Blake is determined to have her father, the editor of the newspaper, promote Dodo to a job with a salary that will allow them to afford to marry. However, her father "Windy" Blake detests Dodo and wants Penny to marry someone of her own social standing. After a quarter of the paper's police reporters are beaten up by gangsters and leave town, Windy sees the answer to his problems by promoting Dodo to police reporter.

Reporting to the police station on his first day on the job, Dodo meets his old Sergeant Ames who is now a uniformed police officer on his own first day on the force. The pair team up to break up the organized crime ring that leads to double crossing, blackmail, murder and a frantic chase in a house of burlesque.

Cast  
William Tracy as Dorian 'Dodo' Doubleday
Joe Sawyer as Officer Ames
Emory Parnell as Winfield 'Windy' Blake
Betty Compson as Martha Blake
Joan Woodbury as Bubbles LaRue
Paul Stanton as Attorney Martin Stafford
Beverly Lloyd as Penny Blake 
Patti Morgan as Ester Dexter
Thomas E. Jackson as Chief McClure

References

External links 
 

1948 films
American black-and-white films
United Artists films
1948 comedy films
American comedy films
Films directed by Fred Guiol
Cinecolor films
Films scored by Heinz Roemheld
1940s English-language films
1940s American films